Abditoconus is a genus of bivalves belonging to the family Xylophagaidae.

The species of this genus are found in Western America.

Species:
Abditoconus anselli  (synonym Xylophaga anselli)
Abditoconus brava 
Abditoconus heterosiphon 
Abditoconus investigatoris

References

Myida
Bivalve genera